Fontaine-le-Port is a commune in the Seine-et-Marne department in the Île-de-France region in north-central France.

Demographics
Fontaine-le-Port has a population of approximately 800. Inhabitants of Fontaine-le-Port are called Portifontains. There is a train station with trains direct to Gare de Lyon (Paris) during peak times and with a connection in Melun on off-peak times. Fontaine Le Port has a primary school as well as a bakery and borders the Seine with a view of the Fontainebleau Forest. The former Barbeau Abbey, dissolved in the French Revolution, was sited here.

See also
Communes of the Seine-et-Marne department

References

External links

1999 Land Use, from IAURIF (Institute for Urban Planning and Development of the Paris-Île-de-France région) 

Communes of Seine-et-Marne